Bartonella rattimassiliensis is a bacterium from the genus Bartonella which was isolated from the rat Rattus norvegicus.

References

External links
Type strain of Bartonella rattimassiliensis at BacDive -  the Bacterial Diversity Metadatabase

Bartonellaceae
Bacteria described in 2004